The Brassfield Formation, named by A.F. Foerste in 1906, is a limestone and dolomite formation exposed in Arkansas, Ohio, Kentucky, Indiana, Tennessee and West Virginia in the United States. It is Early Silurian (Aeronian, Llandoverian) in age and well known for its abundant echinoderms, corals and stromatoporoids.  In Ohio, where the unit has escaped dolomitization, the Brassfield is an encrinite biosparite with numerous crinoid species.

References

Silurian System of North America
Silurian Arkansas
Silurian Indiana
Silurian Kentucky
Geologic formations of Ohio
Geologic formations of Tennessee
Geologic formations of West Virginia
Silurian southern paleotemperate deposits
Rhuddanian
Aeronian
Telychian